Doutsila is a department of Nyanga Province in Gabon.  Its population is 4,623 according to 2013 census. Its capital is Mabanda.

References 

Departments of Gabon